Norway sent competitors to the 2018 Winter Paralympics in Pyeongchang, South Korea. People competed in para-alpine skiing, para-Nordic skiing, para-snowboarding, sledge hockey and wheelchair curling.

Team 

The table below contains the list of members of people (called "Team Norway") that competed in the 2018 Games.

Owe Lüthcke is a sledge hockey referee.  The Norwegian went to  Pyeongchang to referee matches.  He was part of the official Norwegian delegation.

Goals 
For the 2018 Winter Paralympics, Nord-Trøndelag County Council has some goals.  These included getting more people to compete in disability sports. They also wanted to increase the level of accessibility to sports buildings and sports field in Nord-Trøndelag County and the rest of Norway.

Doping 
In December 2017, Norway said it would not send any anti-doping officials to the Winter Olympics or Paralympics.  They are tired of needing to use unpaid volunteers.  They think anti-doping officials need to be paid. Anti-doping Norway chief executive Anders Solheim said, "If you sell TV rights for this arrangement for billions of dollars, then we think it's wrong that we pay for Norwegian doping controllers to help with the controls. An inspector should receive a reasonable salary and his trip paid for the three weeks he or she will be there. By not paying doping controllers, the organisers are de facto relying on volunteers. Anti-doping work should not be a voluntary profession for those who want to. It is downplaying the priority of our work, and we are tired of it."

Medalists

Alpine skiing

Biathlon

Cross-country skiing

Birgit Skarstein competed in two sports: adapted rowing and para-Nordic skiing.  She won a gold medal at the 2017 World Rowing Championships in the PR1 W1x.  Skarstein also went to the 2016 Summer Paralympics, and she finished fourth.  Skarstein has also went to the 2014 Winter Paralympics, competing in para-Nordic skiing.

Para ice hockey

Summary

Norway qualified by finishing in the top four at the 2017 Sledge Hockey World Championships.  Norway played in a tournament in January in Japan.  They lost to the Paralympic Games host nation South Korea 0 - 5 in the gold medal game.  Norway lost to Italy 4 - 3 in overtime at a tournament in Turin in January 2018.

Roster 

Lena Schrøder is the only woman to compete in sledge hockey at the 2018 Winter Paralympics.  While the sport allows both men and women to compete against each other, this rarely happens at the Paralympic level.

Preliminary round

5–8th place semifinal

Fifth place game

Snowboarding 

Banked Slalom

Snowboard cross

Wheelchair curling 

Summary

Round-robin
Norway has a bye in draws 3, 5, 7, 10, 12 and 17.

Draw 1
Saturday, 10 March, 14:35

Draw 2
Saturday, 10 March, 19:35

Draw 4
Sunday, 11 March, 14:35

Draw 6
Monday, 12 March, 09:35

Draw 8
Monday, 12 March, 19:35

Draw 9
Tuesday, 13 March, 09:35

Draw 11
Tuesday, 13 March, 19:35

Draw 13
Wednesday, 14 March, 14:35

Draw 14
Wednesday, 14 March, 19:35

Draw 15
Thursday, 15 March, 9:35

Draw 16
Thursday, 15 March, 14:35

Semifinal
Friday, 16 March, 15:35

Final
Saturday, 17 March, 14:35

References 

2018
Nations at the 2018 Winter Paralympics
2018 in Norwegian sport